The Speedway Great Britain (SGB) Premiership is the top division of speedway league competition in the United Kingdom, governed by the Speedway Control Bureau (SCB) in conjunction with the British Speedway Promoters' Association (BSPA).  It was introduced for 2017 following a restructuring of British speedway.

Teams

Current teams
 Belle Vue Aces
 Ipswich Witches
 Kings Lynn Stars
 Leicester Lions
 Peterborough Panthers
 Sheffield Tigers
 Wolverhampton Wolves

Former teams
 Poole Pirates (2017-2019)
 Rye House Rockets (2017-2018)
 Swindon Robins (2017-2019)

Champions

See also
SGB Championship
SGB National League
British Speedway Promoters Limited
Speedway Control Bureau
List of United Kingdom Speedway League Champions

References

Speedway leagues
SBG Premiership
Sports leagues established in 2017
2017 establishments in the United Kingdom